Eddie Peake (born 1981) is a British artist. His work includes performance, video, photography, painting, sculpture and installation. His art focuses on "implicit drama within relationships between people", and "how things like desire, sexuality and depression impact on them".

Biography
Eddie Peake was born in 1981 at London to artist Phyllida Barlow and poet Fabian Peake. His grandparents are writer Mervyn Peake and artist Maeve Gilmore. He has 4 siblings, including artist Florence Peake. He is a member of the Darwin–Wedgwood family.

Peake took residency at the British School at Rome from 2008 to 2009, and graduated from the Royal Academy Schools in 2013.

Publications
Peake designed the cover for A Short Affair, and a unique artwork inside the book created in response to Will Self’s new short story Civilisation.

Exhibitions and collections
Selected solo exhibitions include:

2018 – White Cube, London 
2015 – Barbican Art Gallery, London
2013 – Focal Point Gallery, Southend, UK

Selected group exhibitions include:

2018 – Heide Museum of Modern Art, Melbourne 
2017 – Museum of Contemporary Art Chicago 
2017 – Zabludowicz Collection, London 
2016 – Eastside Projects, Birmingham, UK 
2015 – Fondazione Memmo, Rome 
2013 – Ujazdowski Castle Center for Contemporary Art, Warsaw 
2012 – Museo d’Arte Contemporanea di Roma

Performance projects include:

2017 – Fiorucci Art Trust Volcano Extravaganza, Naples and Stromboli
2015 – Palais de Tokyo, Paris  
2014 – Institute of Contemporary Arts, London 
2013 – Performa13, New York 
2012 – David Roberts Art Foundation, London 
2012 – The Tanks at Tate Modern, London in conjunction with the Chisenhale Gallery, London  
2012 – Royal Academy of Arts, London 
2012 – Cell Project Space, London

References

External links
 
 White Cube Gallery

1981 births
Living people
British sculptors
English contemporary artists